The Office of the Executive Secretary of the Philippines (formerly the Executive Office) is the head and highest-ranking official of the Office of the President of the Philippines and a member of the Cabinet of the Philippines. The office-holder has been nicknamed as the "Little President" due to the nature of the position. It was given the mandate "to directly assist the President in the management of affairs of the government as well as to direct the operations of the Executive Office." It is headed by the Executive Secretary.

The office was established on October 12, 1936, with Jorge B. Vargas as the inaugural holder.

The incumbent Executive Secretary is retired Chief Justice and GSIS Chairman Lucas Bersamin, who was appointed to the post on September 27, 2022, days after the resignation of his predecessor Vic Rodriguez.

Powers and duties
In Book III, Chapter 9, Section 27 of Executive Order No. 292, the Administrative Code of the Philippines, the role of the Executive Secretary was defined as:

The Executive Secretary possesses so much power since the holder of the office is the chief alter-ego of the President of the Philippines, the Chief Executive.  The Executive Secretary can issue orders in the name of the President, can review and modify decisions of other cabinet secretaries on appeal and can perform numerous other functions as allowed or delegated by the Chief Executive. The Executive Secretary, can also be the top coordinator of the activities of the Executive Branch of the government, if necessary.

List of Executive Secretaries

References

Philippines
Office of the President of the Philippines